Jill Walsh may refer to:

Jill Walsh (cyclist) (born 1963), American cyclist
Jill Paton Walsh (born 1937), English novelist and children's writer